So Can I is a 1975 Iranian short film directed by Abbas Kiarostami.

Plot
Two boys watch a cartoon film about various kinds of animals and one of them claims repeatedly that he can do the same things he sees the animals doing. But then the sight of birds flying plunges him into confusion: the film ends with the shot of an aeroplane circling the skies overhead.

See also
List of Iranian films

External links

Films directed by Abbas Kiarostami
1975 films
1970s Persian-language films
Iranian short films
1975 short films